Andy Stott is a British electronic musician and producer, living in Manchester.

Biography
His debut album was Merciless in 2006, and was followed by Unknown Exception (2008) and Luxury Problems in 2012.

Passed Me By (2011) marked a significant change in Stott's sound; it has none of the elements of his previous dub techno release, opting for a much more bass-heavy sound.

Stott has undertaken several productions under the moniker Andrea and these works were released on Daphne, a sublabel of Modern Love. Most of this work is in association with MLZ / Pendle Coven's Miles Whittaker who used the moniker Millie in the recordings and were released as Millie & Andrea. In 2012, Stott collaborated with the Brooklyn duo The Hundred in the Hands remixing Keep It Low from their 2012 album, Red Night.

Stott's album Luxury Problems received top album awards on both Resident Advisor and Pitchfork in 2012.

In March 2014, Stott and label-mate Whittaker released Drop the Vowels, under the Millie & Andrea moniker.

Artistry
Stott analogised making his music as a scientist who creates compounds by figuring out formulas that use studio gadgets and parts of other music. He never borrows inspiration from his personal experiences when he produces material. As Zach Sokol explained when he interviewed Stott in 2016, "his music draws from where he's at creatively, functioning as a reflection of whatever curiosity is currently making the gears in his head churn." When creating albums, he also tries to make each track have a very different aesthetic by using a variety of equipment and musical influences. As he explained, "I go to the studio and I don't mess around, but at the same time, I don't really know what's going to come out." Modern Love boss Shlom Sviri also contributes suggestions and ideas to Stott when he creates tracks and sequences the order of songs on his LPs.

All of Stott's work touches on many types of experimental styles and genre. Tiny Mix Tapes writer Birkut analysed Stott's works employ neo-futuristic themes and are hard to label in specific genres because they are "shifting disfiguration of Detroit techno, grime, house, and industrial music." Stott's music contains a melodic structure that has been compared by multiple critics to Cocteau Twins and Dead Can Dance. A trademark element in his works is the use of rhythms that are slightly off beat, which often gives the tracks a feeling of anxiety.

Since Luxury Problems, vocals from Stott's former piano teacher Alison Skidmore appear on his music, and numerous pieces about Stott's second, third and fourth studio albums highlighted, as well as praised, the interplay between the menacing instrumentals and the light tones of Skidmore's singing. The vocals have a bright pop tinge and an ethereal tone that contradict the otherwise sinister vibe of the instrumentals. As Stott discussed creating Luxury Problems, "when it was suggested that I use a vocalist, I was worried that it would sound different to the normal way that I write tunes, but when I heard that bass coming from the speakers, that visceral bass, I knew that I still wanted that undertone as a counterpoint to her vocals."

An Electronic Beats review of Luxury Problems described its sounds as presenting "the beautifully decayed aura of concrete and chrome, halogen and grime—the soul of a heaving, monstrous city at twilight, equal (yet often struggling) parts fragile light and enclosing darkness." Writing a PopMatters article about Too Many Voices, Alex Franquelli wrote that "patches of comfort" are included for the "sole purpose of creating an imbalance that makes the darker elements stand out and shine in all their misty glare." Reed Scott Reid's review of Luxury Problems for Tiny Mix Tapes analyse it "represents an apogee of scruffy elegance, curdled rhythms growling within the crumbling masonry of its bitworn shunt." He wrote the vocals "dimly illuminate a pervasive auroral gloom, shafts of ecru and dun mottled with putrescent tinctures; a mournful, angelic presence – a long-deceased sacristan, perhaps – bleeding through the aether as faint drumsteps crack gravel."

Personal life
Stott is married, and has a son who was born in August 2012.

Discography

Albums

Singles and EPs 
As Andy Stott:
2005: Replace (EP)
2005: "Ceramics"
2005: Demon in the Attic (EP)
2006: "Choke" / "For the Love"
2006: "Merciless"
2006: The Nervous (EP)
2007: "Handle with Care" / "See in Me"
2007: The Massacre (EP)
2007: Fear of Heights (EP)
2007: "Hostile"
2008: Bad Landing (EP)
2009: "Brief Encounter" / "Dripping"
2010: "Tell Me Anything" / "Love Nothing"
2011: We Stay Together (EP)
2011: Passed Me By (EP)
2013: Anytime Soon

As Millie & Andrea	
2008: "Black Hammer" / "Gunshot (Stripped)"	
2009: "Spectral Source" / "Ever Since You Came Down"	
2009: "Temper Tantrum" / "Vigilance"
2014: Drop the Vowels (Album)

As Andrea
2010: "You Still Got Me" / "Got to Forget"	
2010: "Retail Juke" / "Write Off"

Remixes
2011: "Know Where (Andy Stott Remix)" on Holy Other's EP With U
2011: "Great (Andy Stott Remix)" on Hatti Vatti EP Great
2012: "Keep It Low (Andy Stott Remix)" on The Hundred in the Hands EP Keep It Low
2012: "Pleasure (Andy Stott Remix)" on Blondes' album Blondes
2013: "Valentine (Andy Stott Remix)" on False Idols' One sided-12"
2013: "Concrete (Andy Stott Remix)" (remix of Batillus song)
2015: "Boys Latin (Andy Stott Remix)" (remix of Panda Bear's song "Boys Latin" off of his 2015 release "Panda Bear Meets the Grim Reaper")
2015: "MG – Europa Hymn (Andy Stott Remix) " (remix of Martin Gore's song)

References

External links
Andy Stott page on Modern Love website

Andrea at Discogs
Millie & Andrea at Discogs
Andy Stott on Last.fm

English electronic musicians
Living people
Musicians from Manchester
Ableton Live users
Year of birth missing (living people)